Limnonectes ibanorum is a species of frog in the family Dicroglossidae.
It is endemic to Borneo.
Its natural habitats are subtropical or tropical moist lowland forests and rivers.
It is becoming rare due to habitat loss.

References

ibanorum
Fauna of Brunei
Amphibians of Indonesia
Amphibians of Malaysia
Endemic fauna of Borneo
Taxonomy articles created by Polbot
Amphibians described in 1964
Amphibians of Borneo